Memo bey Memayi (1849—1918) was an Azerbaijani poet. He wrote under the pseudonym Memayi. He was a relative of Abdurrahim  bey Hagverdiyev.

Life 
Memo bey Muhammed bey oglu Memayi was born in 1849 in Shusha in a noble family. As a child, they called him Memo, the nickname stuck with him later, already as a pseudonym. He received his education in Shusha, where he was engaged in trade. Memo bey Memai was one of the most active members of the association of poets "Mejlisi uns", headed by the famous poetess Khurshidbanu Natavan. He loved to travel, visited many cities in Russia, Central Asia, Turkey, Iran. Later, all the impressions from the trips resulted in a serious work, which he called the "Book of Travels". Unfortunately, this book has not survived to this day. The father of five children, Memo bey gave his youngest daughter to be raised by his wife's brother, the famous playwright, Abdurrahim bey Hagverdiyev.

The poems of Memo-bek, written in the classical style of Aruz in the Azerbaijani and Persian languages, have been preserved. Memo bey was a well-known calligrapher. Well-known calligraphic copies of his work by Natavan and other well-known Azerbaijani poets. At the present time they are kept at the Institute of Manuscripts of Azerbaijan.

The poet died in 1918 in Shusha, where he was buried.

References

Azerbaijani-language poets
Azerbaijani nobility
1849 births
1918 deaths
Writers from Shusha
Persian-language poets
Azerbaijani poets